"Tujhe Kitna Chahne Lage" is a Hindi ballad from the soundtrack album for the 2019 film Kabir Singh. The song was written and composed by Mithoon, and is sung by Arijit Singh. The film depicts a surgeon who descends into alcoholism and a path of self-destruction after his lover marries someone else. According to the filmmakers, the song is about "the phase of love and longing after falling apart".

The song topped a number of music charts in India in July 2019. It also did well on Radio Mirchi, where it was listed at number 3 on the Radio Mirchi website's Top 20 song chart between 6 and 19 July. On the Musicplus charts, the song spent two weeks at number 1 between 26 July and 8 August.

Production 
"Tujhe Kitna Chahne Lage" was composed by Mithoon for the soundtrack album of the film Kabir Singh, and sung by Arijit Singh. The film tells the story of an alcoholic surgeon who descends a path of alcoholism and self destruction after his lover marries someone else. The music producer is Godswill Mergulhao, with drum beats by Bobby Shrivastava.

The song was recorded at Living Water Music, and was mixed and mastered by Eric Pillai at Future Sound Of Bombay. Another version of the song, titled "Tujhe Kitna Chahein Aur" and sung by Jubin Nautiyal, was used in the film.

Singh's version was released on the soundtrack album while Nautiyal's version was used in the film, while also releasing later on the soundtrack album.

Music video 
The music video was released by T-Series on YouTube on 19 June 2019, attracting 20 million views the same day. It has been viewed more than 74 million times since its release.

The filmmakers have described the song as expressing "the phase of love and longing after falling apart". The initially-released video was two minutes long, and mostly featured actor Shahid Kapoor shown as a new and younger-looking avatar. Shahid plays the title role of Kabir, the lead protagonist, who embarks on a path of self-destruction. Kabir's appearance in the music video reflects one of the character's three personas shown in the film. The video shows Shahid Kapoor clean-shaven, for the first time since his appearance in Jab We Met in 2007. The video depicts the story of two lovers. Actress Kiara Advani, who plays Kabir's love interest, Preeti, appears in only a few scenes. Kabir Singh, a surgeon, is portrayed as a sad figure, drinking and smoking to excess after his separation from Preeti. Shahid Kapoor shows him trying to move on with his life, but unable to forget his memories of Preeti.

The song begins with Kabir trying different ways to deal with the breakup. He is shown smoking, going for long, aimless solo rides on his motorcycle, spending time alone, and doing housework to keep himself busy. He visits beautiful landscapes on his bike. Despite his efforts to get over the breakup, he is rendered helpless by his recurring memories. In the music video, flashbacks to past romantic scenes are paralleled with scenes in the present, presenting the story of the two lovers. The song shows Kabir riding a motorcycle to meet Preeti, followed by a romantic kiss between them. The flashback scenes show the couple's happy moments, and are followed by a scene showing Kabir's sadness as his lover is marrying someone else. After a futile attempt to get over the separation, Kabir becomes an alcoholic. He is shown intoxicated and alone.

Charts
In July 2019, "Tujhe Kitna Chahne Lage" topped various music charts in India, including those of Musicplus. It also did well on Radio Mirchi. The song spent two weeks at number 1 on the Musicplus charts between 26 July and 8 August 2019. For two weeks, between 6 to 19 July 2019, it was listed at number 3 in the Top 20 Songs chart published by Radio Mirchi on its website. As at 12 October 2019, the song had remained on its top 20 chart for 17 weeks.

NDTV reported on the song's release, saying that viewers were "guaranteed to play it on loop". Zee News reported that "Tujhe Kitna Chahne Lage" was a candidate for top breakup song of the year. News18 reported that it was the second most-viewed song from the movie Kabir Singh. News18 credited the film's success to its songs, using view-count as a measure of their popularity with young people: on the T-Series YouTube channel, "Tujhe Kitna Chahne Lage" was streamed 96 million times in the first month of the film's release, placing it second among the songs from the Kabir Singh soundtrack.

Spotify announced that "Tujhe Kitna Chahne Lage" was the second most-streamed song of 2019 in India. Another song from the same film, "Bekhayali", was third.

Reception
India Today reported that "Tujhe Kitna Chahne Lage" was a sure candidate as "the next anthem for broken hearts". It described the song as an "off-beat sad-romantic number" that was different from other conventional songs of similar type. The Times of India said: "the song very beautifully captures the emotions of the one smitten by love and at the same time, describes the pain of losing that someone special." Times Now described it as slow and romantic, showing Shahid roaming as a lover gone mad, and said it was a soulful song performed by Arijit, who has expertise in this category. It said that "Tujhe Kitna Chahne Lage" was pleasing to listen to, and that viewers would be humming the song after hearing it a couple of times. Scroll.in characterised Kabir Singh songs, including "Tujhe Kitna Chahne Lage", as "saccharine rock".

DNA India reported that the song was "a soulful heart-wrenching melody" that "perfectly highlights the phase of love and longing" Kabir experiences after separating from his beloved. In its review, DNA reported that "the pangs of separation are beautifully brought out" in Mithoon's lyrics, that the actor had "nailed his expressions to the T", and that Arijit had "crooned the song to perfection". The review noted that Arijit had proved again that no other singer could "bring out the sense of loss in love" in the way that his singing did.

"Tujhe Kitna Chahne Lage" is called a "tearjerker" in the title of another Scroll.in review, in which the song is described as a "pensive ballad that speaks of the hero's heartbreak".  The Statesman called the song a "sad romantic track", and "an off-beat-romantic number", because of its differences from conventional songs of the type. It noted that "Tujhe Kitna Chahne Lage" hints at the tragic ending of a romance. SpotboyE called the song melancholic yet beautiful, showing the protagonist "in a state of melancholy". It praised the stunning visuals of the music video.

In its critical review, Amar Ujala noted that singer Arijit Singh uses his voice in an attempt to transform a song with ordinary lyrics into something extraordinary. The review described the opening lines as heart-touching, but also noted that Mithoon's lyrics weakened towards the end. Godswill's team was considered to have done a good job with the music. Comparing "Tujhe Kitna Chahne Lage" with other contemporary songs, the review called it average, saying that the lyrics were the song's weakest link.

Notes

References 
LYRICS IN HINDI : Tujhe Kitna Chahne Lage | Kabir Singh | Arijit Singh | Shahid Kapoor & Kiara Advani

External links
 

Arijit Singh songs
Songs written by Mithoon
T-Series (company) singles
2019 songs
2010s ballads
Hindi film songs